In algebraic geometry, a nodal surface is a surface in (usually complex) projective space whose only singularities are nodes. A major problem about them is to find the maximum number of nodes of a nodal surface of given degree.

The following table gives some known upper and lower bounds for the maximal number of nodes on a complex surface of given degree.

See also

Algebraic surface

References

 

Singularity theory
Algebraic surfaces